Trinidadian Creole is an English-Based creole language commonly spoken throughout the island of Trinidad in Trinidad and Tobago. It is distinct from Tobagonian Creole – particularly at the basilectal level – and from other Lesser Antillean English creoles.

English is the country's official language (the national standard variety is Trinidadian and Tobagonian English), but the main spoken languages are Trinidadian English Creole and Tobagonian English Creole. Prior to English being designated as the official language, French Creole was more prominent throughout the island. English became the country's official language in 1823. Consequently, government and educational intuitions endorsement of the language change significantly influenced the progressive transition and phaseout of French Creole to English Creole. Both creoles contain elements from a variety of African languages (especially Yoruba). Trinidadian English Creole is also influenced by French, French Creole, Trinidadian Hindustani, Tamil, other South Asian languages, Spanish, Portuguese, Chinese (mainly Cantonese, with some Hakka, and now Mandarin), and Arabic. As of 2011, there were 1 million native speakers.

History
Like other Caribbean English-based creoles, Trinidadian English Creole has a primarily English-derived vocabulary. The island also has a creole with a largely French lexicon, which was in widespread use until the late nineteenth century, when it started to be gradually replaced, due to influence and pressure from the British.

Spanish, Portuguese, a number of African languages (especially Yoruba), Chinese (mainly Cantonese, with some Hakka, and now Mandarin), Trinidadian Hindustani, Tamil, and other South Asian languages have also influenced the language.

Phonological features
Although there is considerable variation, some generalizations can be made about the speech of Trinidad:
 Like a number of related creoles, Trinidadian English Creole is non-rhotic, meaning that  does not occur after vowels, except in recent loanwords or names from Spanish, Hindi/Bhojpuri, and Arabic.
 The dental fricatives of English are replaced with dental/alveolar stops.
 Trinidad English Creole is usually syllable-timed and not stress-timed; therefore it often has full vowels where Standard English has the reduced form /ə/. 
 There is no clear connection between pitch and stress.

Vowels

Consonants

Usage
Both Trinidad and Tobago feature creole continua between more conservative Creole forms and forms much closer to Trinidadian English, with the former being more common in spontaneous speech and the latter in more formal speech. Because of the social values attributed to linguistic forms, the more common varieties (that is, more creolized forms) carry little prestige in certain contexts.

Example words and phrases 
: insolence.
bad-john: a bully or gangster.
bacchanal: any incident or time marked by drama, scandal, confusion or conflict
chinksin: miserly; distributing less than one could or should.
calypso: a musical or lyrical comment on something, particularly popular during Carnival.
dougla: a person having both Indian and African parentage.
macco: someone who gets into other people's business.
maljo: a sickness manifested upon newborn babies and young animals (like puppies) out of envy or ill wishes.
pothound: a mongrel dog of no specific breed or whose breed is unknown; mutt. 
tabanca: heartbreak.
ups kabat: a type of game played with marbles, otherwise known as "marble pitch".
zaboca: avocado 
dingolay: cheerful dance that involves fast paced movements 
broughtupsy/brought-upsie: good manners, proper upbringing or home training

See also
 Trinidadian English
 Tobagonian Creole

Notes

References

Further reading
 Allsopp, Richard, & Jeannette Allsopp (French and Spanish Supplement), 2003, Dictionary of Caribbean English Usage. Kingston: University of the West Indies Press.
 Allsopp, Richard, & Jeannette Allsopp 2010, New Register of Caribbean English Usage.  Kingston: University of the West Indies Press.
Solomon, Denis, 1993. The Speech of Trinidad: A Reference Grammar. Port-of-Spain: UWI School of Continuing Studies.
 James, Winford, 2002, "A Different, not an Incorrect, Way of Speaking, Pt 1"
 Winer, Lise, 2009, Dictionary of the English/Creole of Trinidad & Tobago: On Historical Principles.  Montreal: McGill-Queen's University Press.
 TriniInXisle Compilation of Trinidad Slangs from Dictionary of the English/Creole of Trinidad & Tobago from Winer, Lisa

Languages of Trinidad and Tobago
English-based pidgins and creoles
Languages of the African diaspora
Creoles of the Caribbean
English language in the Caribbean